Hugo Antonio Laviada Molina (born October 31, 1961 in Mérida, Yucatán) is a Mexican politician from Yucatán affiliated with the National Action Party who serves in the upper house of the Mexican Congress.

Personal life and education
Laviada studied medicine in the Autonomous University of Yucatán where he obtained his medical degree. Subsequently, he obtained a master of medical science from the University of Sheffield.

Political career
Laviada is a member of the National Action Party since 1981.

During the 2006 congressional elections he ran as substitute senator of candidate Beatriz Zavala; Zavala won the election but left that position in November 2006 to join President Calderón's cabinet, thus Laviada has been serving as senator for the LX and LXI Legislatures (2006–2012).

References

Living people
1961 births
Members of the Senate of the Republic (Mexico)
National Action Party (Mexico) politicians
People from Mérida, Yucatán
Politicians from Yucatán (state)
Universidad Autónoma de Yucatán alumni
Alumni of the University of Sheffield
Academic staff of Universidad Autónoma de Yucatán
21st-century Mexican politicians